Praitori, also Pretori is a village in the Paphos District of Cyprus, located 2 km north of Kedares.

References

3. Local winery.  https://www.nelionwinery.com/

Communities in Paphos District